Boronia ternata is a plant in the citrus family Rutaceae and is endemic to the south-west of Western Australia. It is an erect shrub with many branches, simple or trifoliate leaves and white to pink four-petalled flowers.

Description
The eight stamens alternate in length with those nearest the sepals longer than those near the petals. Flowering occurs from April to November.

Taxonomy and naming
Boronia ternata was first formally described in 1839 by Stephan Endlicher and the description was published in his book Novarum Stirpium Decades. The specific epithet (ternata) is a Latin word meaning "consisting of threes".

Six varieties of Boronia ternata have been described and the names are accepted by the Australian Plant Census:
 Boronia ternata var. austrofoliosa Duretto;
 Boronia ternata var. elongata Paul G.Wilson;
 Boronia ternata var. foliosa (S.Moore) Paul G.Wilson;
 Boronia ternata var. glabrifolia F.Muell.;
 Boronia ternata var. promiscua Duretto;
 Boronia ternata Endl. var. ternata.

Distribution and habitat
This boronia grows on undulating plains, hills, stony cliffs and breakaways in the Avon Wheatbelt,  Coolgardie and Mallee biogeographic regions of Western Australia.

Conservation
Boronia ternata is listed as "not threatened" by the Government of Western Australia Department of Parks and Wildlife.

References 

ternata
Flora of Western Australia
Plants described in 1839
Taxa named by Stephan Endlicher